Filmworks XVII: Notes on Marie Menken/Ray Bandar: A Life with Skulls features scores by John Zorn for two documentary films. The album was released on Zorn's own label, Tzadik Records, in 2006 and contains music that Zorn wrote and recorded for, Notes on Marie Menken (2006), directed by Martina Kudláček and a percussion score for Ray Bandar: A Life with Skulls directed by Beth Cataldo.

Reception
The Allmusic review by Thom Jurek awarded the album 4 stars stating "it goes through a whirling, dizzying, surreal journey in adventure, exotica, and interior travel. Highly recommended".

Track listing
 "Menken" - 5:26
 "Skull I" - 4:04
 "Glimpses" - 6:37
 "Mood Mondrian" - 4:31
 "Skull II" - 3:31
 "Gogogo" - 8:14
 "Moonplay" - 4:42
 "Skull III" - 3:02
 "Tango Exotique" -5:04
 "Zenscapes" - 1:09
 "Skull IV" - 1:41
 "Arabesque" - 5:10
 "Skull V" - 2:23
 "Bolex Dancing" - 1:37

All music by John Zorn
Produced by John Zorn.

Personnel
John Zorn - Wurlitzer piano, African thumb pianos, alto sax (track 6)
Shanir Ezra Blumenkranz - bass
Jon Madof - guitar
Cyro Baptista - percussion
Kenny Wollesen - drums, percussion

References

Tzadik Records soundtracks
Albums produced by John Zorn
John Zorn soundtracks
2005 soundtrack albums
Film scores
Soundtrack compilation albums
Tzadik Records compilation albums